Euterpe may refer to:

 Euterpe, similar to Utopia (fictional), suggesting perfection (which is not fictional)
 Euterpe, one of the nine Muses in Greek mythology
 Euterpe, an 1863 sailing ship renamed Star of India. Now a museum ship docked at San Diego
 27 Euterpe, an asteroid
 Book II of Histories by Herodotus, one of the books named after the Muses
 Euterpe (plant), a genus of Brazilian palms
 Euterpe, a companion band used by Daevid Allen on his "Good Morning" album (1976)
 Euterpe, an Armstrong Whitworth Ensign aircraft